In the late 1970s, President Anwar Sadat initiated neoliberal policies in Egypt. Following Sadat's assassination, in 1981, President Hosni Mubarak came to power and continued the economic liberalization of Egypt.

Impact of neoliberal policies 
In 1991, these neoliberal reforms unfolded through the Economic Reform and Structural Adjustment Programme (ERSAP), a structural adjustment agreement signed between Mubarak, the International Monetary Fund, and the World Bank. Under the ERSAP, the new, economic policies in Egypt intended to free the economy from government regulation and allow individuals and corporations to regulate the economy based on their self-interests and the free market.

Privatization 
As a result of the limited government role, many public sector companies were privatized. By 2005, the government sold 209 out of a total of 314 public companies to the private sector with financial support from USAID. This privatization increased unemployment and decreased wages and benefits among workers in these public companies. Many of these Egyptians who lost their jobs resorted to informal work as street vendors or drivers in Cairo.

Impact on agriculture
Neoliberal reforms also affected the agricultural sector in Egypt. Before neoliberalism was implemented, the government protected small farmers from losing their land by giving these farmers and their families certain property rights to their plots of land. In the event of eviction, farmers had the right to be compensated for half of the land's value. In 1992, the Egyptian People's Assembly established a new, tenancy law for farmers called Law 96, which was financially supported by the World Bank, International Monetary Fund, and USAID. Law 96 liberalized agricultural rent by pricing agricultural products based on the market rather than on fixed agreements between landowners and farmers working the land. Law 96 increased land rent prices threefold and allowed landowners to evict farmers after a five-year transitional period.

Consequently, government subsidies that supported farmers disappeared and high taxes were put on staple foods produced by local farmers. Farmers had to compete with a growing foreign, industry of agricultural businesses in Egypt, and most lost their livelihoods. Egyptian agriculture transitioned toward an export-oriented production in which entrepreneurs bought arable land from the Egyptian government at low costs. This export-led agriculture benefitted the wealthy in Egypt and foreign companies, while displacing farmers and making it difficult for the poor to buy food due to high food prices in the market. A short documentary, "Pity The Nation", in 2008 portrayed the effect of neoliberal policies on farmers in Mahalla al-Kobra.

Egypt's agricultural sector is dependent on modern energy sources, such as liquified natural gas, petrochemicals, and petroleum fuels. Natural gas reserves in Egypt have increased from 36 to 37 trillion cubic feet, nearly doubling its production since 2003. Natural gas supports the development of many petrochemical and fertilizer plants as well as provides electricity in Egypt. The petrochemical industry uses natural gas as fuel in order to produce ammonia and urea. In 2009, the petrochemical industry consumed approximately 4.8 billion cubic meters.

From 1999 to 2010, approximately 176 foreign energy companies invested in Egypt's abundant, fuel resources. Many of these foreign companies including British Petroleum and British Gas, began to build energy and fertilizer plants in Egypt along the Mediterranean coast in Ras El Bar and surrounding governates in order to export fuel. Along the Mediterranean coast, these energy and fertilizer plants produce 70% of national production. The construction of energy and fertilizer plants in Egypt has affected local farming, in particular, by destroying arable land and crop production. As a result, many Egyptians are protesting against the use of these energy and fertilizer companies particularly in Ras El Bar, Idku, and El Dabaa.

Fertilizer companies
 
The Egyptian military has taken away property rights of local farmers' land in order to build energy and fertilizer plants. The farmers and their families lost their main source of income and many are unemployed. As of June 2013, unemployment rates in Egypt are over 13%. By reallocating land from farmers and the public toward private foreign or state-owned businesses, the government is increasing economic inequality between the wealthy and poor.

EAgrium Fertilizer Complex in Damietta
A major port city along the Mediterranean coast in Egypt, Damietta, relies on the fishing industry, tourism in Ras El Bar, and real estate as its primary source of income. In  Damietta's fishing sector located in Izbat al-Burj surrounded on the east coast by Lake Manzala, approximately 10,000 individuals make their living as local fishers using cheap equipment and boats. Ras El Bar, a middle-class coastal area near Damietta's seaport, is a popular vacation destination for tourists during the summer time. Damietta's elites have permanent residences in Ras El Bar, which contributes to the local real estate sector.

In 2006, the Egyptian Agrium Nitrogen Products Company (EAgrium), a Canadian-based petrochemical company, planned to build a large fertilizer complex in Ras El Bar for the export of urea and ammonia through the EAgrium Marine Terminal. This project was expected to cost around $1.2 billion and produce a maximum capacity of $1.3 million tons of fertilizer.  After Damiettans learned of the EAgrium building plan, they feared that their main sources of income and health would be negatively affected by water and air pollution from the fertilizer complex's petrochemicals. The official construction of EAgrium plant in Damietta began in 2008.

A strong opposition of Damiettans formed against EAgrium, which included an eclectic coalition of Egyptians in different social classes and jobs. Lawyers, businessmen, parliamentary members, farmers, professors at universities, and members of volunteer organizations or unions were a part of this coalition. Some observers suggested that the local Damiettan officials in the coalition against EAgrium were opposed to the project due to a disagreement between the Damietta Governor Fathy El-Baradie and the central government, and that El-Baradie initiated the campaign against the building of this fertilizer complex. The opposition used a diverse range of protesting strategies including non-violent acts such as strikes, sit-ins, petitions, and road blocking.

The success of this campaign may be attributed to evoking the emotions of Damiettans by increasing their fear of the potential dangerous health effects of the plant, gaining the support from tourism developers in Ras El Bar, and the local government's rejection of the project. In addition, Damiettans sought President Mubarak's help to further combat the construction of the fertilizer complex. After many meetings on this issue between the state and locals, EAgrium did not build its petrochemical plant, but however, was given shares in Misr Fertilizer Production Company (MOPCO), which owns a fertilizer plant in Damietta. In 2011, MOPCO planned to build new fertilizer sites in Dameitta. Although the government decided to suspend construction of these two plants, Damiettans were reluctant to believe the government's suspension. The petrochemical plants are going to be built in Damietta despite protesters demanding to relocate the fertilizer plant to other industrial areas.

Idku protests against British Petroleum
The governate of Idku located east of Alexandria in Egypt is mainly a fishing and agricultural community with a local population of 250,000 Egyptians that rely on Lake Idku. Idku has a negative history with petrochemical and natural gas companies since the companies neglect environmental issues that may affect the locals. In 2006, the Egyptian Environmental Affairs Agency (EEAA) discovered that the companies, Rashpetco and Burullus, a joint company between BG, EGPC, and Malaysia's Petroleum Nasional Berhad, illegally dumped industrial waste in the Mediterranean Sea. Analysis of water samples dumped by Rashpetco indicated extremely high levels of nitrogen and oxygen, which passed Egypt's mandated, legal levels of these chemicals and have led to the destruction of Idku's marine and terrestrial environments.

When the Idku community found out that the Head of Egyptian Natural Gas Holding, Taher Abd El-Reheem, proposed a project to build a link between the Northern Alexandria Gas Project and the Al-Borlos Treatment Plant with help from British Petroleum (BP) and British Gap Group (BG), they began anti-BP campaigns and protests. After a year of protesting, BP was forced to relocate its proposed pipeline to another area.

Nuclear power plant in El Dabaa
 
On November 7, 2013, the Interim President of Egypt, Adly Mansour stated that Egypt will re-commence its nuclear power program by building its first nuclear power plant in El Dabaa, a small coastal town in Marsa Matrouh governate.  Since the 1970s, El Dabaa was chosen as a possible location for the nuclear power plant. However, the 1986 Chernobyl disaster in Ukraine postponed the construction of the nuclear power plant for 20 years.

In 2006, Gamal Mubarak, the son of President Hosni Mubarak, announced that the nuclear power plant will be built in El Dabaa at the fourth National Democratic Party conference. After Gamal Mubarak's news release, a strong opposition formed against him. The opposition included businessmen who claimed that Mubarak's nuclear project would hinder their investment in tourism near El Dabaa.

In June 2009, the Egyptian Nuclear Plant Authority signed a $160 million contract for 8 years with the Australian Worley Parsons corporation in which this company would help Egypt build the power plant. During the Egyptian Revolution of 2011, the military council decided to temporarily stop the power plant construction until the next parliamentary elections.

Prior to Mansour's announcement, the city of El Dabaa had control of the land allocated to the power plant construction site but now the Egyptian army has complete control of the land in Marsa Matrouh. The military plants to build the nuclear power plant by 2016.

See also 
 Environmental issues in Egypt

References

Economy of Egypt
Environmental issues in Egypt